Esteban Serrador (1903–1978) was a Chilean actor.  He was mainly involved in film production in Argentina.  He starred in the 1950 film Arroz con leche under director Carlos Schlieper.

Selected filmography
 Our Natacha (1944)
Cristina (1946)

References

External links
 
 

Chilean male film actors
Expatriate male actors in Argentina
1903 births
1978 deaths
20th-century Chilean male actors
Chilean expatriates in Argentina